This list of compositions includes all the published works by English composer Benjamin Britten with opus number.

By genre

Operas

Paul Bunyan, Op. 17:

Operetta in two acts, 114'.
Libretto by W. H. Auden, after the American folktale.
Published by Faber Music.

Peter Grimes, Op. 33:

Opera in a prologue and three acts, 147'.
Libretto by Montagu Slater, after the poem The Borough by George Crabbe.
Published by Boosey & Hawkes.

The Rape of Lucretia, Op. 37:

Opera in two acts, 107'.
Libretto by Ronald Duncan, after the play Le Viol de Lucrèce by André Obey.
Published by Boosey & Hawkes.

Albert Herring, Op. 39:

Comic opera in three acts, 137'.
Libretto by Eric Crozier, loosely after the short story Le Rosier de Mme. Husson by Guy de Maupassant.
Published by Boosey & Hawkes.

The Beggar's Opera, Op. 43:

Ballad opera, 108'.
Libretto after the ballad opera by John Gay.
Published by Boosey & Hawkes.

Let's Make an Opera (The Little Sweep), Op. 45:

An Entertainment for Young People, 130'.
Libretto by Eric Crozier.
Published by Boosey & Hawkes.

Billy Budd, Op. 50:

Opera in four acts, 162'.
Libretto by E. M. Forster and Eric Crozier, after the novella by Herman Melville.
Published by Boosey & Hawkes.

Billy Budd (revised):

Opera in two acts, 158'.
Published by Boosey & Hawkes.

Gloriana, Op. 53:

Opera in three acts, 148'.
Libretto by William Plomer, after Elizabeth and Essex by Lytton Strachey.
Published by Boosey & Hawkes.

The Turn of the Screw, Op. 54:

Opera in a prologue and two acts, 101'.
Libretto by Myfanwy Piper, after the novella by Henry James.
Published by Boosey & Hawkes.

Noye's Fludde, Op. 59:

Music-theatre for community performance, 50'.
Libretto after the Chester Miracle Play as published in English Miracle Plays, Moralities and Interludes
Published by Boosey & Hawkes.

A Midsummer Night's Dream, Op. 64:

Opera in three acts, 144'.
Libretto by the composer and Peter Pears, after the play by Shakespeare.
Published by Boosey & Hawkes.

Owen Wingrave, Op. 85:

Opera for television in two acts, 106'.
Libretto by Myfanwy Piper, after the short story by Henry James.
Published by Faber Music.

Death in Venice, Op. 88:

Opera in two acts, 145'.
Libretto by Myfanwy Piper, after the novella by Thomas Mann.
Published by Faber Music.

Church parables
Curlew River (Op. 71; 1964), based on a Japanese Noh play
The Burning Fiery Furnace (Op. 77; 1966), after the Book of Daniel, Chapter 3
The Prodigal Son (Op. 81; 1968), after the Gospel of Luke, Chapter 15

Ballets
Plymouth Town (ballet for small orchestra; 1931)
The Prince of the Pagodas (1956)
Les Sylphides after Chopin (1940)

Orchestral
 "Two Portraits" for string orchestra (1930). No. 2 is subtitled "E.B.B" – his own initials, and thus a self-portrait (also arr. for viola and strings). No. 3 was unrealised.
 Sinfonietta Op. 1, for five winds and five strings (1932), revised for chamber orchestra (1936)
Simple Symphony for string orchestra (1934)
Soirées musicales, after Rossini (1936)
Variations on a Theme of Frank Bridge for string orchestra (1937)
Mont Juic, a suite of Catalan Dances, jointly composed with Lennox Berkeley (1937)
Canadian Carnival (1939)
Sinfonia da Requiem (1940)
Matinées musicales, after Rossini (1941)
An American Overture (1941)
Prelude and Fugue for 18 Strings (1943)
Four Sea Interludes and Passacaglia from Peter Grimes, for orchestra (1945)
The Young Person's Guide to the Orchestra (1946)
Occasional Overture (1946)
Men of Goodwill – variations on a Christmas carol (1947)
Variations on an Elizabethan Theme, jointly composed with Lennox Berkeley, Arthur Oldham, Humphrey Searle, Michael Tippett and William Walton (1953)
Symphonic Suite from Gloriana (1954)
Suite on English Folk Tunes, A Time There Was... for chamber orchestra (1966/1974)

Concertante
Rondo Concertante for piano and strings (1930)
Double Concerto for Violin, Viola and Orchestra (1932). "Instrumentation...virtually 100% Britten" (Matthews, Erato sleeve note, 1999 – Colin Matthews realised the orchestration).
Piano Concerto (1938; rev. 1945, the original third movement – Recitative and Aria – replaced by an Impromptu)
Violin Concerto (1939; rev. 1958)
Young Apollo for piano, string quartet and string orchestra (1939)
Diversions for Piano Left Hand and Orchestra (1940; rev. 1954)
Scottish Ballad for two pianos and orchestra (1941)
Clarinet Concerto (incomplete: 1st movement only, 1942/3, orch. by Colin Matthews, who later added two further movements from 1940s Britten sketches, incl. Sonata for Orchestra; resulting work, Movements for a Clarinet Concerto, first published 2008)
In memoriam Dennis Brain (c. 1958), unfinished sketch for four horns and orchestra.
Cello Symphony (1963)

Vocal/choral orchestral
Quatre Chansons Françaises for soprano and orchestra (1928)
Two Psalms for chorus and orchestra (1931)
Our Hunting Fathers for soprano or tenor and orchestra (words by W. H. Auden and others; 1936)
The Company of Heaven for speakers, soloists, chorus and orchestra (1937, not performed again until 1989)
Ballad of Heroes, Op. 14, for tenor or soprano, chorus and orchestra (words by W. H. Auden and Randall Swingler; 1939)
Les Illuminations for soprano or tenor and strings (words by Arthur Rimbaud) (1939; three further songs, not included in the cycle, also exist — another setting also called 'Phrase', and 'Aube' and 'A une raison'; they have been orchestrated by Colin Matthews; there also exists a sketch for a further Rimbaud setting)
Serenade for Tenor, Horn and Strings (1943)
The Ballad of Little Musgrave and Lady Barnard for male voice choir and piano (1943)
Saint Nicolas for tenor soloist, children's chorus, chorus, and orchestra (1948)
Spring Symphony for soprano, contralto, and tenor soloists, mixed chorus, boys' choir and orchestra (1949)
Nocturne for tenor, seven obbligato instruments and strings (1958)
Cantata academica for soloists, chorus and orchestra (1959)
War Requiem for soprano, tenor and baritone soloists, chamber ensemble, boys' chorus, mixed chorus, and orchestra (1961)
Cantata misericordium for tenor and baritone soloists, small chorus, string quartet, string orchestra, piano, harp, timpani (1963)
Phaedra for mezzo-soprano, cello, harpsichord, percussion, and string orchestra (words by Robert Lowell; after Jean Racines Phèdre; 1975)
Praise we great men for soloists, chorus and orchestra (words by Edith Sitwell; 1976. Completed by Colin Matthews, 1985)
Welcome Ode for young people's voices and orchestra (1976)

Vocal
 Beware! Three Early Songs for voice and piano (1) "Beware!" (words by Henry Wadsworth Longfellow; 1922) (2) "O that I had ne'er been Married" (words by Robert Burns; 1922) (3) "Epitaph: The Clerk" (words by Herbert Asquith; 1926; rev. 1968, published 1985
 Tit for Tat for voice and piano (words by Walter de la Mare; 1928–31; (1) "A Song of Enchantment" (2) "Autumn" (3) "Silver" (4) "Vigil" (5) "Tit for Tat"; rev. and published 1969; premiered by John Shirley-Quirk and the composer at the 1969 Aldeburgh Festival)
 The Birds (Belloc; 1929, rev. 1934)
On this Island for high voice and piano (1937) (words by W. H. Auden)
Fish in the Unruffled Lakes (1937-1947) (words by W. H. Auden – includes songs originally intended for, but ultimate not used in, On this Island)
Cabaret Songs for medium voice and piano (words by W. H. Auden: "Tell Me the Truth About Love", "Funeral Blues", "Johnny", and "Calypso"; 1940)
Seven Sonnets of Michelangelo for tenor and piano, Op. 22 (1940)
The Holy Sonnets of John Donne for tenor and piano, Op. 35 (1945)
Canticle I: My beloved is mine for tenor and piano (one of the Canticles; 1947)
A Charm of Lullabies for mezzo-soprano and piano (1947)
Canticle II: Abraham and Isaac for alto (or countertenor), tenor, and piano (one of the Canticles; 1952)
Canticle III: Still falls the rain for tenor, horn and piano (words by Edith Sitwell; one of the Canticles; 1954)
Winter Words for tenor and piano, poetry by Thomas Hardy (1954)
The Heart of the Matter for narrator, tenor, horn, and piano (1956)
Songs from the Chinese for soprano or tenor and guitar, Op. 58 (translations by Arthur Waley; 1957)
Sechs Hölderlin-Fragmente for tenor and piano, Op. 61 (1958)
Songs and Proverbs of William Blake for baritone and piano, Op. 74 (1965)
The Poet's Echo for soprano or tenor and piano, Op. 76 (words by Alexander Pushkin; 1965)
Who Are These Children? for tenor and piano, Op. 84 (words by William Soutar; 1969)
Canticle IV: The Journey of the Magi for countertenor, tenor, baritone, and piano (one of the Canticles; 1971)
Canticle V: The Death of Saint Narcissus for tenor and harp (one of the Canticles; 1974)
A Birthday Hansel for high voice and harp (1975)
Eight books of Folksong Arrangements from the British Isles and France, for voice and piano, guitar and harp
Britten's Purcell Realizations, many realizations of songs by Henry Purcell for voice(s) and piano

Choral
A Hymn to the Virgin for chorus and soli (1930; revised 1934)
Christ's Nativity for unaccompanied chorus (1931)
A Boy Was Born for treble voices and choir (1933; revised 1955)
Jubilate Deo in E-flat for chorus and organ (published posthumously; 1934)
Te Deum in C for treble solo, chorus, trumpet, and organ (1934)
Friday Afternoons for children's voices and piano (1935)
Advance Democracy for unaccompanied choir (1938)
A.M.D.G. (Ad Majorem Dei Gloriam), seven settings of Gerard Manley Hopkins for unaccompanied SATB (1939)
A Ceremony of Carols for treble voices and harp (1942); an alternative arrangement for mixed voices and harp (or piano) is popular as well
Hymn to St Cecilia for unaccompanied choir (poem by W. H. Auden; 1942)
Rejoice in the Lamb for four soloists, choir, and organ (text by Christopher Smart; 1943)
Festival Te Deum in E for chorus and organ (1944)
A Wedding anthem 'Amo Ergo Sum'  for soprano, tenor, SATB and organ (1949)
Five Flower Songs for SATB (1950)
Hymn to St Peter for treble soloist, SATB and organ (1955)
Antiphon for SATB and organ, (1955)
Missa Brevis for boys' voices and organ (1959)
Jubilate Deo for chorus and organ (1961)
A Hymn of St Columba for chorus and organ (1962)
The Golden Vanity for five boy soloists, treble chorus and piano (1966)
The Building of the House for chorus or organ or brass and orchestra (1967)
Children's Crusade for nine boy soloists and chorus, percussion, organ and two pianos (text by Bertolt Brecht, trans. Hans Keller; 1968)
Sacred and Profane for SSATB (1974–5)

Chamber/instrumental

Solo piano
Five Waltzes, for piano (1923–25, rev. 1969)
Three Character Pieces, for piano (1930)
Twelve variations on a theme, for piano (1930)
Holiday Diary for piano (1934)
Sonatina romantica for piano (rejected by the composer; 1940)
Night-Piece (Notturno) for piano (written for Leeds International Pianoforte Competition; 1963)
Variations for piano (1965)

Two pianos
Two Lullabies for two pianos (1936)
Introduction and Rondo alla burlesca for two pianos (1940)
Mazurka elegiaca for two pianos (written as part of the collaborative album Homage to Paderewski; 1941)

Organ
Prelude and Fugue on a Theme of Vittoria for organ (1946)

String quartet
String Quartet in F major (1928)
Rhapsody (1929)
Quartettino (1930)
String Quartet in D major (1931, revised 1974)
Alla Marcia (1933)
Three Divertimenti, for string quartet (1933, revised 1936): March, Waltz, Burlesque
String Quartet No. 1 in D major (1941)
String Quartet No. 2 in C major (1945)
String Quartet No. 3 in G major (1975)

Violin and piano
Suite for Violin and Piano (1935)

Viola and piano
Reflections for viola and piano (1930)
Lachrymae for viola and piano, after "If my complaints could passions move" by John Dowland; for William Primrose; 1950)
arranged for viola and string orchestra (for Cecil Aronowitz; 1976)
There is a willow grows aslant a brook (1932), an arrangement of the orchestral poem by Frank Bridge. The title is taken from Shakespeare, and the arrangement by Britten is dedicated to Bridge.

Violin, viola and piano
Two Pieces (1929; first performance 2003)

Solo viola
Etude (1929)
Elegy (1930)

Cello and piano
Cello Sonata in C major (1961)

Solo cello
Cello Suite No. 1 (1964)
Cello Suite No. 2 (1967)
Cello Suite No. 3 (1972)
Tema "Sacher" for cello solo (1976)

Oboe and piano
Two Insect Pieces for oboe and piano (1935)
Temporal Variations for oboe and piano (1936)

Oboe and strings
Phantasy Quartet, Op. 2, for oboe, violin, viola, and cello (1932)

Solo oboe
Six Metamorphoses after Ovid for solo oboe (1951), with quotations from Ovid's poem Metamorphoses

Flute, violin and piano 4-hands
Gemini Variations for flute, violin, and piano four hands (1965)

Solo timpani
Timpani Piece for Jimmy, timpani solo (1955) for James Blades

Three trumpets
Fanfare for St Edmundsbury, short antiphonal and polytonal piece for three trumpets (1959)

Guitar
Nocturnal after John Dowland for guitar (1963)

Harp
Suite for Solo Harp (1969)

Film & drama music
Night Mail (1936), with words by W. H. Auden
The Agamemnon of Aeschylus (1936), play by Louis MacNeice
Out of the Picture (1937), play by Louis MacNeice
The Sword In The Stone (1939), six-part radio drama
The Dark Tower (1946), radio play by Louis MacNeice

By opus number
 Op. 1, Sinfonietta, for five winds and five strings 1932, revised for chamber orchestra 1936
 Op. 2, Phantasy Quartet, oboe quartet, 1932
 Op. 3, A Boy was Born for mixed chorus with organ ad lib, 1933, revised 1955
 Op. 4, Simple Symphony for strings, 1934 (+ also version for string quartet)
 Op. 5, Holiday Diary for piano, 1934
 Op. 6, Suite for violin and piano, 1935
 Op. 7, Friday Afternoons for children's voices and piano, 1935
 Op. 8, Our Hunting Fathers for soprano or tenor and orchestra (words by W. H. Auden), 1936
 Op. 9, Soirées musicales for orchestra (after Rossini), 1936
 Op. 10, Variations on a Theme of Frank Bridge for string orchestra, 1937
 Op. 11, On this Island for soprano or tenor and piano (words by W. H. Auden), 1937
 Op. 12, Mont Juic, suite of Catalan dances, with Lennox Berkeley, 1937
 Op. 13, Piano Concerto, 1938, revised 1945
 Op. 14, Ballad of Heroes for tenor or soprano, chorus and orchestra (words by W. H. Auden and Randall Swingler), 1939
 Op. 15, Violin Concerto, 1939, revised 1958
 Op. 16, Young Apollo for piano and strings, 1939 (withdrawn, published 1982)
 Op. 17, Paul Bunyan, opera (libretto by W. H. Auden), 1941, revised 1976
 Op. 18, Les Illuminations, for soprano or tenor and strings (words by Arthur Rimbaud), 1939
 Op. 19, Canadian Carnival overture, 1939
 Op. 20, Sinfonia da Requiem, 1940
 Op. 21, Diversions for Piano Left Hand and Orchestra, 1940, revised 1954
 Op. 22, Seven Sonnets of Michelangelo for tenor and piano, 1940
 Op. 23
 No. 1, Introduction and Rondo alla burlesca for two pianos, 1940
 No. 2, Mazurka elegiaca for two pianos, 1941
 Op. 24, Matinées musicales for orchestra (after Rossini), 1941
 Op. 25, String Quartet No. 1, 1941
 Op. 26, Scottish Ballad for two pianos and orchestra, 1941
 Op. 27, Occasional Overture, 1941; retitled An American Overture when first performed, 1983
 Op. 27, Hymn to St Cecilia for SSATB, 1942 (replaced Occasional Overture as Op. 27)
 Op. 28, A Ceremony of Carols for trebles and harp, 1942
 Op. 29, Prelude and Fugue for 18 strings, 1943
 Op. 30, Rejoice in the Lamb for soloists, chorus and organ, 1943
 Op. 31, Serenade for Tenor, Horn and Strings, song cycle, 1943
 Op. 32, Festival Te Deum for chorus and organ, 1945
 Op. 33, Peter Grimes, opera (libretto by Montagu Slater, after George Crabbe), 1945
 Op. 33a, Four Sea Interludes from Peter Grimes
 Op. 33b, Passacaglia from Peter Grimes
 Op. 34, Variations and Fugue on a Theme of Henry Purcell (The Young Person's Guide to the Orchestra), 1946
 Op. 35, The Holy Sonnets of John Donne for soprano or tenor and piano, 1945
 Op. 36, String Quartet No. 2, 1945
 Op. 37, The Rape of Lucretia, opera (libretto by Ronald Duncan, after André Obey), 1946, revised 1947
 Op. 38, Occasional Overture, 1946 (withdrawn, published 1984)
 Op. 39, Albert Herring, opera (libretto by Eric Crozier, after Guy de Maupassant), 1947
 Op. 40, My beloved is mine (Canticle I) for soprano or tenor and piano (words by Francis Quarles), 1947
 Op. 41, A Charm of Lullabies for mezzo soprano and piano, 1947
 Op. 42, Saint Nicolas for soloists, chorus, strings, piano (4 hands), percussion and organ, 1948
 Op. 43, The Beggar's Opera after John Gay, 1948
 Op. 44, Spring Symphony for soloists, mixed choir, children's choir and orchestra, 1949
 Op. 45, The Little Sweep, opera (libretto by Eric Crozier), 1949
 Op. 46, A Wedding anthem Amo Ergo Sum for soprano, tenor, SATB and organ (words by Ronald Duncan), 1949
 Op. 47, Five Flower Songs for SATB, 1950
 Op. 48, Lachrymae for viola and piano, 1950
 Op. 48a, Lachrymae for viola and strings, 1976
 Op. 49, Six Metamorphoses after Ovid for oboe, 1951
 Op. 50, Billy Budd, opera (libretto by E. M. Forster and Eric Crozier, after Herman Melville), 1951, revised 1960
 Op. 51, Abraham and Isaac (Canticle II) for alto, tenor and piano (Chester miracle play), 1952
 Op. 52, Winter Words for soprano or tenor and piano (words by Thomas Hardy), 1953
 Op. 53, Gloriana, opera (libretto by William Plomer, after Lytton Strachey), 1953
 Op. 53a, Symphonic Suite "Gloriana" for tenor or oboe and orchestra, 1954
 Op. 54, The Turn of the Screw, opera (libretto by Myfanwy Piper, after Henry James), 1954
 Op. 55, Still Falls the Rain (Canticle III) for tenor, horn and piano (words Edith Sitwell), 1954
 Op. 56a, Hymn to St Peter for treble, SATB and organ, 1955
 Op. 56b, Antiphon for SATB and organ, 1955
 Op. 57, The Prince of the Pagodas, ballet, 1956
 Op. 57a, Pas de six from The Prince of the Pagodas
 Op. 58, Songs from the Chinese for soprano or tenor and guitar, 1957
 Op. 59, Noye's Fludde, opera (Chester mystery play), 1957
 Op. 60, Nocturne for tenor, 7 obbligato instruments and string orchestra, song cycle, 1958
 Op. 61, Sechs Hölderlin-Fragmente for voice and piano, 1958
 Op. 62, Cantata academica, 1959
 Op. 63, Missa brevis for boys' voices and organ, 1959
 Op. 64, A Midsummer Night's Dream, opera (libretto by Benjamin Britten and Peter Pears, after William Shakespeare), 1960
 Op. 65, Sonata for cello and piano, 1961
 Op. 66, War Requiem, 1961
 Op. 67, Psalm CL for children's chorus and instruments, 1962
 Op. 68, Cello Symphony, 1963
 Op. 69, Cantata misericordium, 1963
 Op. 70, Nocturnal after John Dowland for guitar, 1963
 Op. 71, Curlew River, church parable (libretto by William Plomer, after Noh), 1964
 Op. 72, Cello Suite No. 1, 1964
 Op. 73, Gemini Variations for flute, violin and piano four hands, 1965
 Op. 74, Songs and Proverbs of William Blake for baritone and piano, 1965
 Op. 75, Voices for Today for boys' voices, chorus and organ ad lib, 1965
 Op. 76, The Poet's Echo for soprano or tenor and piano (words by Alexander Pushkin), 1965
 Op. 77, The Burning Fiery Furnace, church parable (libretto by William Plomer, after the Book of Daniel), 1966
 Op. 78, The Golden Vanity for boys' voices and piano (words by Colin Graham), 1966
 Op. 79, The Building of the House overture, for chorus or organ or brass and orchestra, 1967
 Op. 80, Cello Suite No. 2, 1967
 Op. 81, The Prodigal Son, church parable (libretto by William Plomer, after the Gospel of Luke), 1968
 Op. 82, Children's Crusade (words Bertolt Brecht/Hans Keller), 1968
 Op. 83, Suite for Harp, 1969
 Op. 84, Who Are These Children? for tenor and piano (words by William Soutar), 1969
 Op. 85, Owen Wingrave, opera (libretto by Myfanwy Piper, based on Henry James), 1970
 Op. 86, The Journey of the Magi (Canticle IV) for countertenor, tenor, baritone and piano (words by T. S. Eliot), 1971
 Op. 87, Cello Suite No. 3, 1971
 Op. 88, Death in Venice, opera (libretto by Myfanwy Piper, based on Thomas Mann), 1973
 Op. 89, The Death of Saint Narcissus (Canticle V) for tenor and harp (words by T. S. Eliot), 1974
 Op. 90, A Suite on English Folk Tunes "A Time There Was" for chamber orchestra, 1974
 Op. 91, Sacred and Profane for five voices (SSATB), 1975
 Op. 92, A Birthday Hansel for high voice and harp (words by Robert Burns), 1975
 Op. 93, Phaedra, cantata (words by Robert Lowell, after Jean Racine), 1975
 Op. 94, String Quartet No. 3, 1975
 Op. 95, Welcome Ode for young people's voices and orchestra, 1976

Notes

References

Sources
 
 
 Britten Thematic Catalogue

 List
Britten, Benjamin